Hannu Viirlas (born June 12, 1960) is a Finnish former ice hockey defenceman.

Viirlas played 14 games with HC TPS of the SM-liiga during the 1982–83 SM-liiga season.

References

External links

1960 births
Living people
Finnish ice hockey defencemen
HC TPS players